Errill is a village in southwest County Laois, Ireland, near the County Tipperary and County Kilkenny borders. It is centred on a village green around which sits a shop with the local post office, two pubs and a Roman Catholic church.

History

Errill was the site of an ancient monastic settlement, of which the medieval St. Kieran's Church (a national monument) is the only remnant. Also, Lisduff House, an old landlord's house located in Lisduff, Errill, had many English Royals holidaying at the household in its day. There was also a Lisduff Train Station in the early 1800s. The village consisted of three quarries, two of which remain active today.

Sport
Errill GAA was the local Gaelic Athletic Association club, which was established in 1928, before amalgamation with neighbouring Rathdowney GAA club. The local GAA team, now Rathdowney-Errill GAA Club, has won five Laois Senior Hurling Championships since their amalgamation in 2005. Errill Primary School also have a history of Cumann na mBunscoil victories. The Errill boys' team won their division in 2016 while the Errill girls' team reached a division 2 semi-final in the same year. Errill beat neighbours Rathdowney in the 2016 Junior C Championship and followed up this victory in August 2017 by winning promotion again with a win in the Junior B Championship.

See also
 List of towns and villages in Ireland

References

Towns and villages in County Laois
Townlands of County Laois